A fog display, fog screen, vapor screen or vapor display is a system that uses haze machines or water vapor to create a semi-transparent wall, or "curtain" of suspended particles which trapped in a thin sheet (laminar flow) of air and are illuminated by a projector, in order to produce a display whose images seem to float in mid air. Several commercial systems exist, such as  FogScreen, Displair and Heliodisplay. There is also an open-source variant being developed called Hoverlay II

This system can be expanded using multiple projectors to create a three-dimensional image, thus becoming a volumetric 3D display.

See also
 Smoke and mirrors

References 

Display technology